During the 1998–99 Greek football season, Panionios F.C. competed in the Alpha Ethniki.

Season summary
Panionios reached the quarter-finals of the Cup Winners' Cup for the first time in their history, being knocked out 7-0 on aggregate by eventual champions Lazio. However, league form suffered and the club only avoided relegation on goal difference. Manager Ronnie Whelan left at the end of the season.

First-team squad
Squad at end of season

Left club during season

Alpha Ethniki

League table

Results summary

Results by round

Cup Winners' Cup

First round

Second round

Quarter-finals

References

Panionios
Panionios F.C. seasons